The 1987–88 FIS Ski Jumping World Cup was the ninth World Cup season in ski jumping. It began in Thunder Bay, Canada on 5 December 1987 and finished in Planica, Yugoslavia on 27 March 1988. The individual World Cup was won by Matti Nykänen and Nations Cup by Finland.

Map of world cup hosts 
All 15 locations which have been hosting world cup events for men this season. Events in Liberec and Harrachov were completely canceled.

 Four Hills Tournament
 Swiss Tournament

Calendar

Men

Standings

Overall

Nations Cup

Four Hills Tournament

References 

World cup
World cup
FIS Ski Jumping World Cup